757 Naval Air Squadron (757 NAS) was a Naval Air Squadron of the Royal Navy's Fleet Air Arm. It was first formed as a Telegraphist Air Gunner Training Squadron in 1939, operating out of RNAS Worthy Down (HMS Kestrel), but after three months it went into abeyance, only to reform again in the same role, at the same location, in 1941 and operating until 1942. It then reformed as a Fighter Pool Squadron & Operational Training Unit at RNAS Puttalam (HMS Rajaliya), in Sri Lanka, in 1943. After a brief spell at RNAMY Tambaram (HMS Valluru), in India, the squadron finally disbanded at RNAS Katukurunda (HMS Ukussa), in Sri Lanka,  at the beginning of 1946.

History of 757 NAS

Telegraphist Air Gunner Training Squadron (1939) 

It was initially equipped with Osprey, a British two-seater biplane light bomber aircraft and Shark II, a carrier-borne biplane torpedo bomber aircraft, however, the squadron went into abeyance on the 15 August 1939.

Telegraphist Air Gunner Training Squadron (1941 - 1942) 

757 Naval Air Squadron reformed at Worthy Down, on 6 March 1941, again as a Telegraphist Air Gunner Training Squadron. From March the squadron was equipped with Nimrod II, a British carrier-based single-engine, single-seat biplane fighter aircraft, and Skua II, a Carrier-based dive bomber/fighter aircraft, however, from May 1941, it flew only Skua. In April 1942, it replaced these with Lysander III, a British army co-operation and liaison aircraft and continued to operate with these until disbanding at Worthy Down on the 1 December 1942.

Fighter Pool Squadron & Operational Training Unit (1943 - 1946) 

757 Naval Air Squadron reformed at RNAS Puttalam (HMS Rajaliya), in Sri Lanka, as a Fighter Pool Squadron & Operational Training Unit, on the 20 October 1943. It was equipped with various marks of Corsair, an American fighter aircraft, Hellcat, an American carrier-based fighter aircraft, Wildcat, an American carrier-based fighter aircraft, and Seafire, a naval version of the Supermarine Spitfire adapted for operation from an aircraft carrier.

The squadron provided pilots with Deck Landing Training, with aircraft carrier deck landing training carried out on a number of escort carriers. On the 5 and 6 November 1944, HMS Battler, an Attacker-class escort carrier, supported 757 NAS deck landing training. The following April, in 1945, between the 14 and 20, another Attacker-class escort carrier, HMS Stalker, was the supporting carrier and this was followed by HMS Hunter, also an Attacker-class escort carrier, over the 29 and 30 June. From the 9 to the 14 July 1945, HMS Begum, a Ruler-class escort carrier, was next to support the carrier deck landing training.

On the 15 July 1945, 757 NAS moved to RNAMY Tambaram (HMS Valluru), in Chennai, Tamil Nadu, India. The squadron remained at Tambaram for the next four months, before moving to RNAS Katukurunda (HMS Ukussa), located near the town of Kalutara in Sri Lanka, on the 12 November 1945. On the 29 January 1946, 757 NAS disbanded at Katukurunda.

Aircraft flown 

757 Naval Air Squadron has flown a number of different aircraft types, including:
Hawker Osprey (May 1939 - Aug 1939)
Blackburn Shark Mk II (May 1939 - Aug 1939)
Hawker Nimrod II (Mar 1941 - May 1941)
Blackburn Skua Mk.II (Mar 1941 - Apr 1942)
Westland Lysander Mk.III (Apr 1942 - Dec 1942)
Vought Corsair Mk II (Dec 1943 - Jan 1946)
Vought Corsair Mk III (Dec 1943 - Jan 1946)
Vought Corsair Mk IV (Dec 1943 - Jan 1946)
North American Harvard IIA (Oct 1943 - Jan 1946)
North American Harvard IIB (Oct 1943 - Jan 1946)
Grumman Wildcat Mk V (Apr 1944 - May 1945)
Grumman Wildcat Mk VI (Apr 1944 - May 1945)
Supermarine Seafire L Mk IIc (Jun 1944 - Jan 1946)
Supermarine Seafire F Mk III (Jun 1944 - Jan 1946)
Grumman F6F-3 Hellcat F. Mk. I (Jul 1944 - Jan 1946)
Grumman F6F-5 Hellcat F. Mk. II (Jul 1944 - Jan 1946)

Naval Air Stations 

757 Naval Air Squadron operated from a number of naval air stations of the Royal Navy in England and overseas in Sri Lanka and India:
Royal Naval Air Station WORTHY DOWN (24 May 1939 - 15 August 1939)
Royal Naval Air Station WORTHY DOWN (6 March 1941 - 1 December 1942)
Royal Naval Air Station PUTTALAM (20 October 1943 - 15 July 1945)
Royal Naval Aircraft Maintenance Yard TAMBARAM (15 July 1945 - 12 November 1945)
Royal Naval Air Station KATUKURUNDA (12 November 1945 - 29 January 1946)

Commanding Officers 

List of commanding officers of 757 Naval Air Squadron with month and year of appointment and end:

1939
Lt-Cdr V. J. Sommerset-Thomas, RN (May 1939-Aug 1939)

1941 - 1942
Lt-Cdr (A) C. R. Hodgson, RNVR (Mar 1941-Jul 1942)
Lt-Cdr (A) J. J. Dykes, RNVR (Jul 1942-Dec 1942)

1943 - 1946
Lt-Cdr (A) G. W. Parrish, DSC, RNVR (Oct 1943-May 1945)
Lt-Cdr (A) R. W. Durrant, DSC, RNZNVR (May 1945-Nov 1945)
Lt-Cdr (A) F. W. Barring, RNVR (Nov 1945-Jan 1946)

References

Citations

Bibliography

700 series Fleet Air Arm squadrons
Military units and formations established in 1939
Military units and formations of the Royal Navy in World War II